César Mansanelli (born 29 August 1980 in Córdoba, Argentina) is an Argentine footballer currently playing for Belgrano de Córdoba of the Primera División Argentina.

Teams
  Racing de Córdoba 2003-2005
  Belgrano de Córdoba 2005–2013
  Atlético de Rafaela 2013–2014
  Belgrano de Córdoba 2014–2015
  Racing de Córdoba
2016–Present

References

External links
 
 

1980 births
Living people
Argentine footballers
Racing de Córdoba footballers
Club Atlético Belgrano footballers
Argentine Primera División players
Association footballers not categorized by position
Footballers from Córdoba, Argentina